Die Firma Hesselbach is a German television series.

See also
Die Hesselbachs
List of German television series

External links
 

1960 German television series debuts
1967 German television series endings
Television shows set in Hesse
German-language television shows
Das Erste original programming
Television series based on radio series